is a private junior college in Toyonaka, Osaka, Japan.

History 
The junior college opened in April 1951, but the predecessor of the school was founded in 1915 in Osaka city. It moved to Toyonaka in 1954.

Courses
 Music

See also
  Osaka College of Music

References

External links 
 Osaka College of Music website 

Educational institutions established in 1951
Japanese junior colleges
1951 establishments in Japan
Universities and colleges in Osaka Prefecture
Private universities and colleges in Japan